Bayue may refer to:

Bayue, the eighth month of the Chinese calendar
The Summer Is Gone, 2016 Chinese film